This is a chronological list of the most notable people from Rotterdam, who were either born and raised there or were long-term residents.

Born in Rotterdam

15th century
Desiderius Erasmus (1466–1536), humanist (long-term resident, born in Gouda)

16th century
Piet Hein (1577–1629), naval officer (born in Delfshaven)
Willem Pieterszoon Buytewech (1591–1624), painter

17th century
Simon de Vlieger (1601–1653), painter
Hendrik Martenszoon Sorgh (1610–1670), painter
Willem Kalf (1619–1693), painter
Aert Jansse van Nes (1626–1693), naval officer
Pieter de Hooch (1629–1684), painter
Pierre Bayle (1647–1706), theologian and philosopher
Grinling Gibbons (1648–1721), wood carver
Adriaen van der Werff (1659–1722), painter (born in Kralingen)
Bernard Mandeville (1670–1733),  philosopher, political economist and satirist
Henrik Brenkman (1681–1736), jurist
James_Scott,_Duke_of_Monmouth  (1649-1685), illegitimate son of Charles II of England

18th century
Pieter Hellendaal (1721–1799), composer
Gijsbert Karel van Hogendorp (1762–1834), politician
Hendrik Tollens (1780–1856), poet

19th century
Willem Hendrik de Vriese (1802–1862), botanist
Jacobus van 't Hoff (1852–1911), chemist
George Hendrik Breitner (1857–1923), painter
Sophia Goudstikker (1865-1926), feminist and photographer
Kees van Dongen (1877–1968), painter
Hendrik Willem van Loon (1882–1944), writer
Louis Davids (1883–1939), cabaretier
Dina Appeldoorn (1884–1938), composer and pianist
Anthony van Hoboken (1887–1983), musicologist
Hans Kramers (1894–1952), physicist
Rudolf van Reest (1897–1979), writer
Sidney J. van den Bergh (1898–1977), manager, general and politician
Pieter Menten (1899–1987), art collector and war criminal

20th century

1900s 
Harry Gideonse (1901–1985), American President of Brooklyn College, and Chancellor of the New School for Social Research
Willem de Kooning (1904–1997), painter
Bep van Klaveren (1907–1992), boxer

1910s 
Marie Braun (1911–1982), swimmer
Joseph Luns (1911–2002), politician
Christiaan Lindemans (1912–1946), double agent
Leo Fuld (1912–1997), singer
Marten Toonder (1912–2005), comics artist
Willy den Ouden (1918–1997), swimmer
Sacco van der Made (1918–1997), actor (voice of the Dutch Scrooge McDuck)
Rie Mastenbroek (1919–2003), Olympic 3-time gold medal swimmer

1920s 

Nida Senff (1920–1995), swimmer
Bram Appel (1921–1997), footballer
Norbert Schmelzer (1921–2008), politician
George Blake (1922-2020), spy
Thea Beckman (1923–2004), author
Faas Wilkes (1923–2006), footballer
Rita Reys (1924–2013), jazz singer
Til Gardeniers-Berendsen (1925–2019), politician
Hans Kuypers (1925–1989), neuroscientist
Henk Hofland (1927–2016), journalist, columnist and writer

1930s 
Bob den Uyl (1930–1992), writer
Edsger Dijkstra (1930–2002), computer scientist
Jan Hoogstad (1930–2018), architect
Gerrit Noordzij (1931–2022), typographer, typeface designer, and author
Janwillem van de Wetering (1931–2008), writer
Elly Ameling (born 1933), sopraan
Toon Meerman (born 1933), footballer
Robert Wolders (1936–2018), actor
Fong Leng (born 1937), Chinese-Dutch fashion designer
Coen Moulijn (1937–2011), footballer
Bart Berman (born 1938), pianist
Greetje Kauffeld (born 1939), jazz singer and Schlager musician
Ruud Lubbers (1939–2018), politician
Martin Lodewijk (born 1939), comics artist

1940s 
Gerard Cox (born 1940), cabaretier
Wim Mager (1940–2008), director of the Apenheul Primate Park
Neelie Kroes (born 1941), politician
Leo Beenhakker (born 1942), football coach
Pim Doesburg (1943-2020), football goalkeeper
Jules Deelder (1944–2019), poet and writer
Marianne Heemskerk (born 1944), swimmer
Heleen Dupuis (born 1945), ethicist, politician
Rem Koolhaas (born 1944), architect
Betty Stöve (born 1945), tennis player
Martin van Creveld (born 1946), Israeli military historian 
Wim Jansen (born 1946), footballer
André van Duijn (born 1947), comedian
Bill van Dijk (born 1947), musical performer, singer
Ronald Sørensen (born 1947), politician
Pim Fortuyn (1948–2002), politician
Johan Boskamp (born 1948), footballer, footballmanager and TV personality
Johnny Young (born 1947), singer

1950s 
Ron Steens (born 1952), hockey player
Arthur Benjamins (born 1953), artist
Ineke Donkervoort (born 1953), rower
Loes Luca (born 1953), actress, comedian, singer
Anita Meyer (born 1954), singer
Willem van Veldhuizen (1954), painter
Tim Steens (born 1955), hockey player
Peter Houtman (born 1957), footballer
Joop Hiele (born 1958), football goalkeeper

1960s 
Adrie Andriessen (1960–2021), footballer
Hans van Baalen (1960–2021), politician
Euclid Tsakalotos (born 1960), economist, politician
Berry Westra (born 1961), bridge player
Paul de Leeuw (born 1962), comedian
Mario Been (born 1963), footballer, footballmanager
Jan Mulder (born 1963), pianist, composer, conductor
Sonny Silooy (born 1963), footballer
Olaf Ephraim (born 1965), banker, politician
Francis Hoenselaar (born 1965), dart player
DJ Sun (born 1966), music producer, DJ, radio host
 Angela Visser (born 1966) model, actress, Miss Holland 1988 and Miss Universe 1989.
Robert Eenhoorn (born 1968), baseball player

1970s 
Winston Bogarde (born 1970), footballer
Richard Krajicek (born 1971), tennis player
Kristie Boogert (born 1973), tennis player
Ferry Corsten (born 1973), musician
Eline Jurg (born 1973), bobsledder
Brenda Starink (born 1974), swimmer
Ferry Piekart (born 1974), children's writer
Giovanni van Bronckhorst (born 1975), footballer
Michiel van den Bos (born 1975), composer
Suzanna Lubrano (born 1975), singer
Francisco Elson (born 1976), NBA player for the Milwaukee Bucks
U-Niq (born 1976), rapper
Madelon Baans (born 1977), swimmer
Ellery Cairo (born 1978), footballer
Fatima Moreira de Melo (born 1978), hockey player
Raemon Sluiter (born 1978), tennis player

1980s 
Pascal Bosschaart (born 1980), footballer
Robert Doornbos (born 1981), racing driver
Robin van Persie (born 1983), footballer
Ruben van Schalm (born 1988), Dutch Photographer
Dex Elmont (born 1984), judoka
Iekeliene Stange (born 1984), fashion model
Feis Ecktuh (1986–2019), rapper
Luigi Bruins (born 1987), footballer
Royston Drenthe (born 1987), footballer
Nouchka Fontijn (born 1987), boxer
Michiel Kramer (born 1988), footballer

1990s 
Joan Franka (born 1990), Turkish-Dutch singer
Georginio Wijnaldum (born 1990), footballer
Kim de Baat (born 1991), racing cyclist
Gaite Jansen (born 1991), actress
Nigel Melker (born 1991), racing driver
Abbey Hoes (born 1994), actress
Rahima Ayla Dirkse (born 1994), model and beauty queen
Oliver Heldens (born 1995), Dutch DJ, electronic music producer
Jordan Larsson (born 1997), Swedish footballer
Joey Dale (born 1993), Dutch DJ, electronic music producer
 Halil Dervişoğlu (born 1999), footballer

References

 
Rotterdam